Tarsal formula is the number of segments of the tarsi, which has 3 numbers a-b-c, starting with the fore leg (a), then the middle leg (b), then the hind leg (c). For example, a tarsal formula of "5-5-4" as found in the Trictenotomidae means there are 5 segments in the fore leg's tarsi, 5 segments in the middle leg's tarsi, and 4 segments in the hind leg's tarsi. This character is especially useful at family rank and higher.

References

Insect anatomy